Fast Freight may refer to:

 Fast Freight (film), a 1929 Our Gang short
 The Fast Freight, a 1921 film starring Fatty Arbuckle